Destinn may refer to:

 Emmy Destinn (1878–1930), Czech opera singer
 6583 Destinn

See also 
 Destin (disambiguation)

German-language surnames